Senator Snyder may refer to:

Adam W. Snyder (1799–1842), Illinois State Senate
Cooper Snyder (1928–2019), Ohio State Senate
Frederic Beal Snyder (1859–1951), Minnesota State Senate
George Snyder (politician) (1929–2017), Maryland State Senate
H. Diane Snyder (fl. 2000s–2010s), New Mexico State Senate
Herb Snyder (born 1953), West Virginia State Senate
Oliver P. Snyder (1833–1882), Arkansas State Senate
Richard A. Snyder (1910–1978), Pennsylvania State Senate
Sid Snyder (1926–2012), Washington State Senate
Simon Snyder (1759–1819), Pennsylvania State Senate (died before taking office)
Vic Snyder (born 1947), Arkansas State Senate